Michael Georg Conrad (5 April 1846 – 20 December 1927) was a German writer and philosopher. He was the founder and editor of Die Gesellschaft.

External links
 
 
 

1846 births
1927 deaths
People from Marktbreit
People from the Kingdom of Bavaria
German Lutherans
German People's Party (1868) politicians
Members of the 9th Reichstag of the German Empire
German male writers
German-language writers
German philosophers
German magazine founders